Li Zhanshu (born August 30, 1950) is a retired Chinese politician, who was the chairman of the Standing Committee of the National People's Congress from 2018 to 2023. He was the third-ranking member of the Politburo Standing Committee of the Chinese Communist Party, China's top decision-making body, between 2017 and 2022.

Li began his political career in rural regions of his native Hebei province, rising through the ranks as the Communist Party Secretary of Xi'an, Governor of Heilongjiang province, and the Party Secretary of Guizhou province. In 2012, he became chief of the General Office of the Chinese Communist Party. Following the 18th Party Congress, Li became one of the top advisors to party General Secretary Xi Jinping. He is regarded by the media as a senior member of "Xi Jinping Clique", one of the main political factions within the Chinese Communist Party.

Early career
Li was born in Pingshan County, Hebei province on August 30, 1950. He became a member of the Chinese Communist Party (CCP) in 1975. He started his career as an ordinary functionary in the capital of his home province, Shijiazhuang, working as an office worker for the Shijiazhuang commercial bureau and the Shijiazhuang party committee. In 1980, Li studied night school at Hebei Normal University. After graduating, he was promoted to Party Secretary of Wuji County (at around the same time, the party chief of neighbouring Zhengding County was Xi Jinping, current General Secretary of the Chinese Communist Party).

For the next decade, Li took on progressively senior roles in Hebei province, including deputy party chief and Commissioner of Shijiazhuang prefecture (not equivalent to mayor), head of the provincial Communist Youth League organization, Commissioner of Chengde prefecture, member of the Party Standing Committee of Hebei and Secretary-General of the provincial party committee.

In a leaked US Diplomatic cable from 2008, Li told US diplomats that he had the "unwelcome distinction" of leading the first CYL delegation to the US following the 1989 Tiananmen Square protests.

Regional leadership
In 1998, Li was transferred to Shaanxi province to serve on its party leadership council and become the head of its provincial Organization Department. Beginning in January 2002, Li became the Party Secretary of Xi'an. In May, he concurrently took on the role of deputy party chief of Shaanxi province. During his term in Xi'an, Li was known to have set the goal for Xi'an to become the "best city in the western interior".

In December 2003, Li became Deputy Party Secretary of Heilongjiang, and assumed the post of Vice Governor about a year later. At the time, outside observers classified Li as a member of the Tuanpai, i.e., officials with a background in the Communist Youth League. On December 25, 2007, then Governor Zhang Zuoji resigned, and Li took over as acting Governor, confirmed in January 2008. In August 2010, Li became the Party Secretary of Guizhou province, taking on his first role in the top office of a province.  At the time, Li was not yet a full member of the Central Committee; it was considered very rare for someone to hold office as a provincial party chief without a full seat on the Central Committee.

General Office
In July 2012, Li was transferred to Beijing to serve as the executive deputy director of the General Office of the Chinese Communist Party, being groomed to replace Ling Jihua.  He assumed office as Director of the General Office two months later.
  Three months later, Li was also named Secretary of the Work Committee for Organs Directly Reporting to the Central Committee. Regarded as a "rising star", Li was elected to the Politburo of the Chinese Communist Party at the 18th Party Congress held in November 2012, which was unusual for a General Office Chief (Ling Jihua, for example, was not a member of the Politburo), signalling that Li would hold significant clout under Xi Jinping's administration. Additionally, as was customary of the general office chief, Li was also named a Secretary of the Central Secretariat. In 2013, Li was also named chief of the General Office of the newly formed National Security Commission.

Li has played a major role in facilitating a strong relationship between China and Russia, and is the first General Office chief in post-Mao China to have played such an active role in foreign affairs. For example, in 2015 Li was sent as a "special envoy" of Xi Jinping to meet with Vladimir Putin in Moscow. During the 2015 Moscow Victory Day Parade held in Moscow, Li was a member of the Chinese delegation. Li was known to have accompanied Xi on the leader's various meetings with foreign guests, including on Xi's 2015 state visit to the United States. In September 2022, during a meeting with senior Russian figures, Li pledged China's "understanding and full support" in Russia's position on the issue of the 2022 Russian invasion of Ukraine. He said, "given the circumstances, Russia has taken necessary measures. China understands, and we are coordinating on various aspects." He went on to directly blame the United States and NATO for "expanding NATO directly on Russia's doorstep, threatening Russia's national security and the lives of Russian citizens."

Li, seen as one of the most influential members of Xi Jinping's inner circle, was considered a "dark horse" candidate for the 19th Politburo Standing Committee, China's top decision-making body which took office in 2017.

Li was an alternate member of the 16th and 17th Central Committees of the Chinese Communist Party and was a full member of the 18th Central Committee.

Standing Committee
Li was chosen to be a member of the 19th Politburo Standing Committee, China's top decision-making body, at the 1st Plenary Session of the 19th Central Committee of the Chinese Communist Party on 25 October 2017.

On March 17, 2018, Li was elected as the Chairman of the Standing Committee of the National People's Congress.

On September 8, 2018, Li acted as special representative to General Secretary Xi Jinping on a visit to North Korea to participate in the 70th anniversary celebrations of the founding of the Democratic People's Republic of Korea.

Regarding his work, Li claims to abide by a "three-nos" principle: they are: "no messing around with other people, no playing games, no loafing on the job."

In November 2020, following the expulsion of 4 pro-democracy lawmakers in the Hong Kong Legislative Council, Li defended the expulsion, arguing that the decision was both "necessary" and "appropriate."

Family
Li's great-uncle  (1908–1967) served as Vice Governor of Shandong province.

Li's wife, Wang Jinfeng, was born on October 30, 1953.

Li Qianxin 
Li's eldest daughter, Li Qianxin (born 20 June 1982), also known as Naomi Li, has been reported by Chinese-language media as being active in Hong Kong, and is one of the Vice-Chairs of the Hua Jing Society, a youth organization promoting mainland-Hong Kong cooperation. Li Qianxin reportedly bought a townhouse in Hong Kong's Stanley Beach for $15 million in 2013.

According to a New York Times investigation, Li Qianxin bought a 4-story property at 6 Stanley Beach Road in the Southern District of Hong Kong Island in 2013 for US$15 million through Century Joy Holdings Ltd., a company registered in Hong Kong with Li Qianxin as the sole director, and incorporated in the British Virgin Islands. In October 2019, when The New York Times contacted her regarding a scandal involving Deutsche Bank and their illicit hiring practices, she dissolved Century Joy Holdings Ltd. within a matter of hours. Li Qianxin was found to have pushed Deutsche Bank to hire her younger sister, who was deemed unqualified for the bank's corporate communications team, but received the job offer anyway.

Her husband, Chua Hwa Por (born 17 May 1985), was also part of the report. Chua owned a racehorse called Limitless, and also took over a company named Tai United in early 2017, when he was appointed as chairman. Under his supervision, Tai United bought a large share in the Peninsula Hotel, as well as the entire 79th floor of a Hong Kong skyscraper (reported earlier by SCMP to be at The Center). Chua stepped down from Tai United shortly afterwards in July 2017, when Next Magazine reported on the purchases and Chua's potential ties to Li Qianxin's father, Li Zhanshu. In January 2018, Chua then sold the majority of his Tai United shares.

Together, Li Qianxin and Chua jointly own another company, named Chua & Li Membership. Li Qianxin and Chua both had listed the 6 Stanley Beach Road unit as their residence until early 2020, when Li Qianxin changed her address to another apartment Chua owns in Hong Kong, located on the 60th floor of a building.

Also according to the investigation, Li Qianxin joined networks such as the Hua Jing Society in Hong Kong, a group that networks princelings and tycoons.

Li Duoxi
Li's youngest daughter, Li Duoxi (born 25 May 1987), works at Deutsche Bank.

Awards and honors
 Order of Friendship (Russia, 2022)

See also
 Xi Jinping Administration
 General Office of the Chinese Communist Party
 National Security Commission of the Chinese Communist Party

References 

1950 births
Living people
Alternate members of the 17th Central Committee of the Chinese Communist Party
Chairmen of the Standing Committee of the National People's Congress
Chairperson and vice chairpersons of the Standing Committee of the 13th National People's Congress
Chinese Communist Party politicians from Hebei
Communist Party secretaries of Xi'an
Delegates to the 18th National Congress of the Chinese Communist Party
Delegates to the 19th National Congress of the Chinese Communist Party
Delegates to the 20th National Congress of the Chinese Communist Party
Delegates to the 10th National People's Congress
Delegates to the 11th National People's Congress
Delegates to the 12th National People's Congress
Deputy Communist Party secretaries of Shaanxi
Directors of the General Office of the Chinese Communist Party
Governors of Heilongjiang
Hebei Normal University alumni
Members of the 18th Politburo of the Chinese Communist Party
Members of the 19th Politburo Standing Committee of the Chinese Communist Party
Members of the Secretariat of the Chinese Communist Party
People's Republic of China politicians from Hebei
Political office-holders in Guizhou
Politicians from Shijiazhuang